The General George S. Patton Memorial Museum, in Chiriaco Summit, California, is a museum erected in tribute to General George S. Patton on the site of the entrance of Camp Young, part of the Desert Training Center of World War II.

Exhibits include a large collection of tanks used in World War II and the Korean War, as well as memorabilia from Patton's life and career – especially in regard to his service at the Desert Training Center – and from soldiers who trained there. Development of the Colorado River Aqueduct and natural-science exhibits are also displayed. In addition, a 26-minute video is shown, detailing Patton's military service and the creation of the Desert Training Center.

Though Patton spent less than four months at the Desert Training Center, his establishment of the training grounds directly impacted more than one million troops.

The museum is at the Chiriaco Summit exit of Interstate 10, 30 miles/48 km east of Indio. It is 1000 feet west of the Chiriaco Summit Airport.

Camp Young

Camp Young was the headquarters for General Patton's 3rd Armored Division. Camp Young was the 3rd Armored Division main maneuvers area in training for tank warfare. Camp Young was active during the war and closed in 1944. War Department ordered Patton in March 1942 to create a desert training center in California. The goal was to prepare troops to battle  North Africa to fight the Nazis.
The 3rd Armored Division, IV Corps Command Headquarters, and an Engineer Camouflage Battalion were stationed at Camp Young. Troop trained at Camp Young and it sub camps before overseas deployment. Camp Young, 3,279.89 acres, was acquired from the Department of the Interior. South and West of Camp Young  13 ranges were built for mortar (37mm, 75mm, and 155mm) and small caliber firearm.

Camp Young received air support from the Shavers Army Airfield built in April 1943. The United States Army Air Forces Fourth Air Force used the landing strip as a training base during World War 2. The airstrip was used to support the Camp Young reconnaissance activities, and aircraft were used to coordinate tanks and other armored vehicles from the air. Each sub-camp had an air support Airfield. After the war, the airfield was given to the local government for civilian use. It is still in use today as the Chiriaco Summit Airport (L77)). It is located one mile (1.85 km) northeast of the business district of Chiriaco Summit.

Camp Young was the headquarters and managed sub camps:

California Divisional Camps:
 Camp Coxcomb
 Camp Granite
 Camp Essex and Camp Clipper
 Camp Iron Mountain
 Camp Ibis
 Camp Pilot Knob
 Camp Young

California Depots – hospitals:
 Camp Freda – Depot and hospital
 Camp Desert Center Depot and hospital
 Banning General Hospital – Hospital
 Torney General Hospital – Hospital
 Camp Goffs – Depot and hospital
 San Bernardino Engineer Depot – Depot and hospital
 Needles Station Hospital
 Cherry Valley Hospital

Arizona Divisional Camps:
 Camp Bouse (WW2 secret camp)
 Camp Horn
 Camp Hyder
 Camp Laguna and the Yuma Test Branch – both  became the Yuma Proving Ground
 A few bombing and artillery ranges

Major airfields:
 Blythe Army Air Base – in use as Airport
 Desert Center Army Airfield – in use as Airport
 Thermal Army Airfield – in use as Airport
 Rice Army Airfield  – abandoned
 Shavers Summit Army Airfield in use as Chiriaco Summit Airport
Minor airfields:
 Camp Coxcomb Army Field  – abandoned
 Dateland Air Force Auxiliary Field – abandoned
 Camp Essex Army Field – abandoned
 Camp Goffs Army Field – abandoned
 Camp Horn Army Airfield – abandoned
 Camp Ibis Army Field – abandoned  
 Camp Iron Mountain Army Field – in use as Iron Mountain Pumping Plant Airport (72CL)
 Laguna Army Airfield – in use at Yuma Proving Ground

California Historical Landmark
California Historical Landmarks Marker at Camp Young – Desert Training Center sites reads:

Camp Young – Riverside
 NO. 985 DESERT TRAINING CENTER, CALIFORNIA–ARIZONA MANEUVER AREA (ESTABLISHED BY MAJOR GENERAL GEORGE S. PATTON, JR.) – CAMP YOUNG – The D.T.C. was established by Major General George S. Patton, Jr., in response to a need to train American combat troops for battle in North Africa during World War II. The camp, which began operation in 1942, covered 18,000 square miles. It was the largest military training ground ever to exist. Over one million men were trained at the eleven sub-camps (seven in California).

See also

 Patton Monument (West Point)
 General George Patton Museum, Fort Knox, Kentucky
 California Historical Landmarks in Riverside County, California
 California during World War II

References

External links

 General George S. Patton Memorial Museum
 General Patton Memorial: Organizational Profile – National Center for Charitable Statistics (Urban Institute)
 facebook.com, General George S. Patton Memorial Museum
 Training Center Boogie – Song by John Malcolm Penn: Desert training camps

California Historical Landmarks
Patton, George S.
Military and war museums in California
Museums in Riverside County, California
Military in Riverside County, California
George S. Patton